Mareuil en Périgord (literally Mareuil in Périgord) is a commune in the department of Dordogne, southwestern France. The municipality was established on 1 January 2017 by the merger of former communes Mareuil (the seat), Beaussac, Champeaux-et-la-Chapelle-Pommier, Les Graulges, Léguillac-de-Cercles, Monsec, Puyrenier, Saint-Sulpice-de-Mareuil and Vieux-Mareuil.

Population

See also
Communes of the Dordogne department

References

Communes of Dordogne